Kim Binsted (born in New Jersey, US) is a professor in the Information and Computer Sciences Department at the University of Hawaii. Binsted's work explores artificial intelligence, human-computer interfaces, and long-duration human space exploration.

Biography

Binsted completed her B.Sc. in Physics at McGill University in 1991. During her time at McGill she was a founding member of Montreal's On The Spot improv comedy troupe.

Her Ph.D. in Artificial Intelligence was received from the University of Edinburgh in 1996. During her time at the University of Edinburgh she performed in what is now the Edinburgh Fringe's longest running improvised comedy troupe, The Improverts.

Between 1997 and 1999, Binsted worked as an Associate Researcher at Sony's Computer Science Laboratories in Tokyo on human-computer interfaces.

During the summer of 2003 and 2004 Binsted was a NASA Summer Faculty Fellow at Ames Research Center in the Neuroengineering Lab where she worked on sub-vocal speech recognition technology. She held the post of Chief Scientist on the FMARS 2007 Long Duration Mission, which entailed a four-month Mars exploration analogue on Devon Island in the Canadian High Arctic. On sabbatical during 2009 Binsted visited scientists at the Canadian Space Agency (CSA) to work on the CSA's planetary analogues program. From 2002 to 2014 she was a team member at the UH-NASA Astrobiology Institute.

In 2017, she was one of seventy-two applicants to become a Canadian astronaut.  She was unsuccessful.

Binsted is the principal investigator on HI-SEAS (Hawaii Space Exploration Analog and Simulation).

References

External links
Kim Binsted Biography, University of Hawai'i

Alumni of the University of Edinburgh
American women computer scientists
American computer scientists
Year of birth missing (living people)
Living people
University of Hawaiʻi faculty
McGill University Faculty of Science alumni
20th-century American scientists
21st-century American scientists
Scientists from New Jersey
Artificial intelligence researchers
HI-SEAS
American women academics
20th-century American women scientists
21st-century American women scientists